Asanee–Wasan ( or Asanee & Wasan Chotikul) is a Thai rock band fronted by brothers Asanee "Pom" and Wasan "Toe" Chotikul. Among the band's hits is a 1989 song that puts into verse the lengthy ceremonial name for Bangkok, "Krung Thep Mahanakhon" ("กรุงเทพมหานคร"). The elder brother, Asanee, is known for his guitar solos and his wild, "rock star" persona. His way of singing ballads is often described as broken-heart jiggo (jiggo is Thai slang for bad boy, based on Gigolo in English and Italian). The bespectacled Wasan is known for his sensitive songs and softer, gentler style. Their songs often include a hook chorus sung by female backing vocalists.

History
The Chotikul brothers were born in Loei Province in Northeast Thailand (Asanee: April 9, 1955, Wasan: March 25, 1957) and moved to Bangkok to study. They started out in the 1970s as a folk-rock combo called Isn't. The band name is derived from Isan, their home region in Thailand. The band participated in a folk song competition and won the award in 1974. After that they released several albums, including Sao ngam ta (Beautiful Girl) and Siam Square. Asanee, wanting to go in a more rock direction left the band, while Wasan continued for a time with Isn't. Asanee joined The Oriental Funk band of Rewat Buddhinan and later Butterfly.

The brothers released their first album as Asanee–Wasan in 1986, Bah horb fang (Carry a lot of Things)  with Nite Spot. They were signed to Grammy Entertainment (now GMM Grammy) and released another album, Puk-chee roy nah (Sufficiency Makeover), which included the hits "Nung Mit Chid Klai"  ("A Close Friend") and "Kor Keui Sanya" ("Used to Promise").

In concerts they frequently throw autographed guitar picks into the crowd as souvenirs. They are glued onto their guitar or microphone stand ready to be handed out. When they released their sixth album, Rung gin narm (Rainbow), they decided not to have any concerts to support the album. Therefore, a guitar pick was included in each copy of Rung gin narm (though not in subsequent production runs of the album).

Besides his work with his brother, Asanee Chotikul has been an influential producer for such bands as Micro and Tanate Waragulnukrao. When Thai rocker Sek Loso wanted to land a record deal, he mailed a demo tape to Asanee, who then released it on his own label, More Music, a subsidiary of GMM Grammy.

Asanee–Wasan celebrated with a 20th anniversary concert on May 12–14, 2006 at Impact Arena in Muang Thong Thani. Originally, just one show had been planned, but when tickets quickly sold out, two more were added, which also sold out. The pair also played shows in Nakhon Ratchasima and in Phuket. They were backed by Fahrenheit.

In 2011, they left GMM Grammy and co-found a new company, Music Union, with fellow producers Chatree Kongsuwan, Nitipong Hornak and singer/businessman Vudtinun Bhirombhakdi. Asanee and Wasan have released some singles, available via digital download, with the new company. Artists joining Music Union includes Blackhead, Jamjun Project, Nicole Theriault, etc.

Wasan solo works
In an Asanee–Wasan album, Wasan usually sings lead on only one or two songs. In the remaining songs, he would play guitar alongside his brother and sing backing harmonies. Nevertheless, the song Khong Derm (Still the Same), one of the duo's hits is sung by Wasan. Another hit song Nueng Mit Chit Klai was Wasan's work from his Isn't days and was rearranged for Asanee–Wasan. Wasan has some albums of his own with Isn't. Even after becoming Asanee–Wasan, he released two more solo albums, Guitar Toe in 1988 with Isn't, and Khuen Toe in 1992.

Discography
 Bah horb fang (Carry a lot of Things), 1986
 Puk-chee roy nah (Sufficiency Makeover), 1987
 Kra-dee dai narm (As Happy As a Lark), 1988
 Fuk tong (The Pumpkin), 1989
 Sup-pa-rod (Pineapple), 1990
 Rung gin narm (Rainbow), 1993
 Bang Or (Ah!), 1997
 Jin ta na karn  (Imagination), 2002
 Sen Yai  (DVD–VCD of concert "Sen Yai" on 2 February 2003, also on cassette, two versions), 2003
 Asanee & Wasan  (boxed set of first eight albums), 2006
 Dek Lieng Gae  (The Shepherd Boy), 2006
 Concert 20th Year  (DVD–VCD), 2006
 Pug Ron (Vacation), 2007

Singles with Music Union
 Pud loy loy, 2012 (Asanee)
 Khao rai rue plao (Is it bad news?), 2013 (Wasan)

References

External links
 Asanee biography from matichon.co.th
 Artist page at More Music
 Photo gallery of 20th anniversary concert

Thai rock music groups
Thai musical duos
Sibling musical duos